Kania may refer to the following:

Localities in Poland
Kania, Ostrów Wielkopolski County in Greater Poland Voivodeship, west-central Poland
Kania, Słupca County in Greater Poland Voivodeship, west-central Poland
Kania, Kuyavian-Pomeranian Voivodeship, north-central Poland
Kania, Pomeranian Voivodeship, northern Poland
Kania, Koszalin County in West Pomeranian Voivodeship, north-western Poland
Kania, Stargard County in West Pomeranian Voivodeship, north-western Poland

Polish aircraft
PZL Kania, a Polish follow-up to the Mil Mi-2 helicopter
 PZL S-4 Kania, a Polish trainer and glider towing aircraft of the 1950s
PZL.56 Kania, a Polish pre-war project of a fighter aircraft

Other
Kania (plant), a genus of plants native to New Guinea and Philippines
Kania (surname)

See also

Kania Mała, a village in Gmina Chociwel, Stargard County, West Pomeranian Voivodeship, north-western Poland
Kania Nowa, a village in Gmina Serock, Legionowo County, Masovian Voivodeship, east-central Poland
Kania Polska, a village in Gmina Serock, Legionowo County, Masovian Voivodeship, east-central Poland
Ostrów-Kania, a village in Gmina Dębe Wielkie, Mińsk County, Masovian Voivodeship, east-central Poland